Virgin Radio Romania is a Romanian national radio station with coverage in almost all the cities of the country.

Virgin Radio started broadcasting in Romania on 9 January 2017. Virgin Radio Romania is part of a media group that also operates Europa FM and Vibe FM.

Created as Romania's interactive radio station for youngsters, Virgin Radio Romania is the place for new music and innovation.

It is the only Romanian radio station that became the official partner for Tomorrowland, as well as for major festivals which took place locally and across Europe.

Virgin Radio Romania is broadcasting 24/7 hip hop, r&b and new music. In the past years, it has generated one of the most engaging contests and campaigns on air and on line. The station hosted the internationally known Secret Sound contest (called CSAUD), as well as the first on air and online live marathons, having Andrei Niculae as a host.

Virgin Radio Romania is the first station in Romania officially  recognized on TikTok and the first to allow listeners to control the music and the programs via a feature called PlayDJ that can be used in Virgin Radio Romania App or via www.virginradio.ro.

The morning show has two hosts, Bogdan Ciudoiu and Ionuț Bodonea, Mondays to Fridays, from 6:30 AM until 10:00 AM. During the day, Virgin Radio Romania has programs focused on music and interaction via WhatsApp, Virgin Radio Romania App, Social Media and the website.

Frequencies

References

Radio stations in Romania
Romanian-language radio stations